The Third Atkinson Ministry was a responsible government in New Zealand, sometimes referred to as part of the Continuous Ministry. It took office after the retirement of Frederick Whitaker and continued the personnel and policies of the Whitaker and Hall ministries.

Background
Harry Atkinson, who had been Treasurer in the previous two Ministries of John Hall and Frederick Whitaker, retained the entire outgoing Cabinet with the exception of the retiring Whitaker. Walter Woods Johnston later left the Ministry to return to his own private business and was replaced with Edwin Mitchelson.

This third Atkinson Ministry lacked popular support due to its perceived parsimony and the limited number of Public Works projects it undertook. In June 1884 the government lost a no-confidence motion, but neither of the Opposition leaders, William Montgomery and Sir George Grey, was able to put together a majority government in its place. Before calling an election, Atkinson announced a policy of ‘closer settlement’ of land, Crown pre-emption in purchases of Māori land, and encouragement of local industry through moderately protectionist tariffs.

At the 1884 general election, Sir Julius Vogel returned to New Zealand politics and led a party of followers into the House. As the factional arithmetic was unclear, Atkinson's ministry remained in power until the House met and Vogel was able to put together a coalition with Robert Stout.

Ministers
The following members served in the Hall Ministry:

See also
 New Zealand Government

Notes

References

Ministries of Queen Victoria
Governments of New Zealand
1883 establishments in New Zealand
Atkinson Ministry
Atkinson Ministry